Tang Jiali may refer to:

Tang Jiali (model) (born 1976), Chinese model
Tang Jiali (footballer) (born 1995), Chinese footballer